Hahn Air Base was a United States Air Force installation near Lautzenhausen in Germany for over 40 years. The major unit was the United States Air Force's 50th Tactical Fighter Wing during most of the years it was active.

It was originally built by French workers in 1951.  In September 1952 the 7356th Air Base Group stood up and started to get the base ready for operational forces.

The 50th Fighter Bomber Wing deployed to Hahn from Clovis Air Force Base, New Mexico during Operation Fox Able 27 in August 1953.  After name changes the 50th Tactical Fighter Wing was deactivated in 1991 after 35 years at Hahn.

In September 1993, Hahn Air Base was turned over to the German Government. The USAF kept a radio communications site until it was deactivated in 2012.

See also 
 Frankfurt International Airport

References

External links

 The 38th Tactical Missile Wing at Hahn Air Base
 Were You a Lucky Puppy? 
 TAC Missileers - Matador and Mace Missileers

Installations of the United States Air Force in Germany
Military airbases established in 1951
Military installations closed in 1993
1951 establishments in West Germany
1993 disestablishments in Germany